Carla Salomé Rocha (born 25 April 1990) is a Portuguese long-distance runner who competed in the 10,000 metres at the 2016 European Athletics Championships and 2017 World Championships, finishing 28th in the latter competition with a time of 32:52.71. She finished 8th in the 2019 London Marathon with a time of 2:24:47.

References

External links

Profile at Olympic Committee of Portugal 

1990 births
Living people
People from Vizela
Portuguese female long-distance runners
S.L. Benfica athletes
Athletes (track and field) at the 2016 Summer Olympics
Athletes (track and field) at the 2020 Summer Olympics
Olympic athletes of Portugal
Sportspeople from Braga District